Xu Zhongbo (born October 1960) is a general in the People's Liberation Army of China, currently serving as political commissar of the People's Liberation Army Rocket Force. He is an alternate member of the 19th Central Committee of the Chinese Communist Party. He is a delegate to the 19th National Congress of the Chinese Communist Party.

Biography
Xu was born in Rushan, Weihai, Shandong province in October 1960. He enlisted in the People's Liberation Army in March 1978. He served in the 20th Group Army since December 2003, what he was eventually promoted to political commissar in 2013. In October 2014, he was appointed political commissar of the 83rd Group Army, taking over from Xu Yuanlin. In February 2016, he became political commissar of the Western Theater Command Ground Force. In December 2017, he became political commissar of the Joint Logistics Support Force of the Central Military Commission, a position he held until July 2020, when he was promoted to become political commissar of the People's Liberation Army Rocket Force. 

He was promoted to the rank of major general (Shaojiang) in 2010, lieutenant general (zhongjiang) in July 2017, and general (Shangjiang) in July 2020.

References

1960 births
Living people
People from Rushan, Shandong
Alternate members of the 19th Central Committee of the Chinese Communist Party
People's Liberation Army generals from Shandong